Emergency evacuation is the urgent immediate egress or escape of people away from an area that contains an imminent threat, an ongoing threat or a hazard to lives or property.

Examples range from the small-scale evacuation of a building due to a storm or fire to the large-scale evacuation of a city because of a flood, bombardment or approaching weather system, especially a tropical cyclone. In situations involving hazardous materials or possible contamination, evacuees may be decontaminated prior to being transported out of the contaminated area. Evacuation planning is an important aspect of business management of which emergency evacuation forms a part.

Reasons

Evacuations may be carried out before, during, or after disasters such as:

 Natural disasters
 Eruptions of volcanoes
 Tropical cyclones
 Floods
 Earthquakes
 Tsunamis
 Wildfires/Bushfires
 Industrial accidents
 Chemical spill
 Nuclear accident
 Transport
 Road accidents
 Train wreck 
 Emergency aircraft evacuation
 Fires
 Industrial fires
 Military attacks
 Bombings
 Terrorist attacks
 Military battles
 Imminent nuclear war
 Structural failure
 Viral outbreak
 Robbery
 Plane crash

Planning

Emergency evacuation plans are developed to ensure the safest and most efficient evacuation time of all expected residents of a structure, city, or region. A benchmark "evacuation time" for different hazards and conditions is established. These benchmarks can be established through using best practices, regulations, or using simulations, such as modeling the flow of people in a building, to determine the benchmark. Proper planning will use multiple exits, contra-flow lanes, and special technologies to ensure full, fast and complete evacuation. Consideration for personal situations which may affect an individual's ability to evacuate is taken into account, including alarm signals that use both aural and visual alerts, and also evacuation equipment such as sleds, pads, and chairs for non-ambulatory people. Considering the persons with a disability during an emergency evacuation is important. This is because it is crucial that every user gets out of the building or to a safe place in the building, thus also the persons with disabilities or the non- ambulatory people. Regulations such as building codes can be used to minimize the negative consequences of the threat triggering the evacuation and optimize the need to self-evacuate without causing alarm. Proper planning, that covers designated actions to ensure safety of the users in emergencies, will implement an all-hazards approach so that plans can be reused for multiple hazards that could exist.

Therefore, key elements for emergency planning and preparedness are early warnings for the people inside the building by emergency helpers but also voice assistance, facilities to leave the building safe and fast, such as exit routes and good evacuation practices. The evacuation managing team must know what to do in emergency situations and which actions to take.

Sequence
The sequence of an evacuation can be divided into the following phases:
 detection
 decision
 alarm 
 reaction
 movement to an area of refuge or an assembly station
 transportation
The time for the first four phases is usually called pre-movement time.

The particular phases are different for different objects, e.g., for ships a distinction between assembly and embarkation (to boats or rafts) is made. These are separate from each other. The decision whether to enter the boats or rafts is thus usually made after assembly is completed.

Small-scale

The strategy of individuals in evacuating buildings was investigated by John Abrahams in 1994. The independent variables were the complexity of the building and the movement ability of the individuals. With increasing complexity and decreasing motion ability, the strategy changes from "fast egress", through "slow egress" and "move to safe place inside building" (such as a staircase), to "stay in place and wait for help". The third strategy is the notion of using a designated "safe haven" on the floor. This is a section of the building that is reinforced to protect against specific hazards, such as fire, smoke or structural collapse. Some hazards may have safe havens on each floor, while a hazard such as a tornado, may have a single safe haven or safe room. Typically persons with limited mobility are requested to report to a safe haven for rescue by first responders. In most buildings, the safe haven will be in the stairwell.

By investing the strategy of individuals in evacuating buildings, the variable human reactions is a complex factor to take into account during an evacuation. This is a critical factor for escaping fast out of the building or to a "safe haven". During an emergency evacuation, people do not immediately react after hearing the alarm signal. This is because an evacuation drill is more common. Therefore, they will start evacuating when there is more information given about the degree of danger. During an evacuation, people often use the most known escape route, this is often the route through which they entered the building. Thereby, people mostly adapt the role follower in emergencies. These human reactions will determinate the strategy of individuals in evacuating buildings.

The most common equipment in buildings to facilitate emergency evacuations are fire alarms, exit signs, and emergency lights. Some structures need special emergency exits or fire escapes to ensure the availability of alternative escape paths. Commercial passenger vehicles such as buses, boats, and aircraft also often have evacuation lighting and signage, and in some cases windows or extra doors that function as emergency exits. Commercial emergency aircraft evacuation is also facilitated by evacuation slides and pre-flight safety briefings. Military aircraft are often equipped with ejection seats or parachutes. Water vessels and commercial aircraft that fly over water are equipped with personal flotation devices and life rafts.

Since the emergence of The Internet of Things technologies, new techniques are appearing, which involves new equipment. Most of them are wireless devices such as IDs scanner, beacons or backscatter system. The new techniques are for example based on  a communication protocol such as Wi-Fi, Bluetooth, UWB or RFID and the use of indoor positioning system.
The use of The Internet of Things technologies in small scale evacuations can result in  a faster evacuation time: Mostly by localizing the fire sources, analysing the fire spreading inside the building or finding people that are trapped inside the building.
Some buildings can have a monitoring interface that provides all these kind of information to evacuate in the best way possible.

Large-scale
The evacuation of districts is part of disaster management. Many of the largest evacuations have been in the face of wartime military attacks. Modern large scale evacuations are usually the result of natural disasters. The largest peacetime evacuations in the United States to date occurred during Hurricane Gustav and the category-5 Hurricane Rita (2005) in a scare one month after the flood-deaths of Hurricane Katrina.

Hurricanes

Despite mandatory evacuation orders, many people did not leave New Orleans, United States, as Hurricane Katrina approached. Even after the city was flooded and uninhabitable, some people still refused to leave their homes.

The longer a person has lived in a coastal area, the less likely they are to evacuate. A hurricane's path is difficult to predict. Forecasters know about hurricanes days in advance, but their forecasts of where the storm will hit are only educated guesses. Hurricanes give a lot of warning time compared to most disasters humans experience. This allows forecasters and officials to "cry wolf," making people take evacuation orders less seriously. Hurricanes can be predicted to hit a coastal town many times without the town ever actually experiencing the brunt of a storm. If evacuation orders are given too early, the hurricane can change course and leave the evacuated area unscathed. People may think they have weathered hurricanes before, when in reality the hurricane didn't hit them directly, giving them false confidence. Those who have lived on the coast for ten or more years are the most resistant to evacuating.

Public transportation
Since Hurricane Katrina, there has been an increase in evacuation planning. Current best practices include the need to use multi-modal transportation networks. Hurricane Gustav used military airlift resources to facilitate evacuating people out of the affected area. More complex evacuation planning is now being considered, such as using elementary schools as rally points for evacuation. In the United States, elementary schools are usually more numerous in a community than other public structures. Their locations and inherent design to accommodate bus transportation makes it an ideal evacuation point.

Enforcement
In the United States, a person usually cannot be forced to evacuate. To facilitate voluntary compliance with mandatory evacuation orders first responders and disaster management officials have used creative techniques such as asking people for the names and contact of their next-of-kin, writing their Social Security Numbers on their limbs and torso to enable identification of remains, and refusing to provide government services in the affected area, including emergency services.

Kits
In preparation for emergency evacuation situations, experts often advise having an individual emergency evacuation kit prepared and on hand prior to the emergency. An emergency evacuation kit is a container of food, clothing, water, and other supplies that can be used to sustain an individual during lag time. Lag time is the period between the actual occurrence of an emergency and when organized help becomes available, generally 72 hours, though this can vary from a few hours to several days. It may take this long for authorities to get evacuation shelters fully up and functional. During this time, evacuees may suffer fairly primitive conditions; no clean water, heat, lights, toilet facilities, or shelter. An emergency evacuation kit, or 72-hour kit, can help evacuees to endure the evacuation experience with dignity and a degree of comfort.

Cyber-physical systems
The development of digital infrastructure resources opened a new research area in the design of cyber-physical systems to provide the individual with safer options during an emergency evacuation.

See also

References

 Gershenfeld, Neil, Mathematical Modelling. OUP, Oxford, 1999.
 Hubert Klüpfel, A Cellular Automaton Model for Crowd Movement and Egress Simulation. Dissertation, Universität Duisburg-Essen, 2003.
 Stollard, P. and L. Johnson, Eds., "Design against fire: an introduction to fire safety engineering design", London, New York, 1994.
 Künzer, L. Myths Of Evacuation in FeuerTRUTZ International 1.2016, p. 8-11

External links
 Fire Safety Engineering Group at the University of Greenwich
 Evacuation routes for the US by state.
 

Safety
Emergency management
Disaster preparedness in the United States